Si-won, also spelled Shi-won, or See-won, is a South Korean unisex given name. Its meaning differs based on the hanja used to write each syllable of the name. There are 54 hanja with the reading "shi" and 46 hanja with the reading "won" on the South Korean government's official list of hanja which may be registered for use in given names. It also means "cool, refreshing" from the adjective "Shiwon-hada" in Korean.

People
People with this name include:

Ryu Si-won (born 1972), South Korean actor and singer
Choi Si-won (born 1987), South Korean actor and singer, member of boy band Super Junior
Lee Si-won (born 1987), South Korean actress

Fictional characters
Fictional characters with this name include:

Sung Shi-won, female character in 2012 South Korean television series Reply 1997
Park Shi-won, female character in 2017 South Korean film The Discloser
Park Shi-won, male character in 2018 South Korean television series A Poem a Day
Park Si-won, female character in 2019 South Korean television series Spring Turns to Spring
Lee Shi-won, female character in 2019 South Korean television series Failing in Love

See also
List of Korean given names

References

Korean unisex given names